The 1988 All-Big Eight Conference football team consists of American football players chosen by various organizations for All-Big Eight Conference teams for the 1988 NCAA Division I-A football season.  The selectors for the 1988 season included the Associated Press (AP).

Offensive selections

Quarterbacks
 Steve Taylor, Nebraska (AP-1)

Running backs
 Barry Sanders, Oklahoma State (AP-1)
 Eric Bieniemy, Colorado (AP-1)
 Ken Clark, Nebraska (AP-1)

Tight ends
 Todd Millikan, Nebraska (AP-1)

Wide receivers
 Hart Lee Dykes, Oklahoma State (AP-1)

Centers
 Jake Young, Nebraska (AP-1)

Offensive tackles
 Bob Sledge, Nebraska (AP-1)
 Byron Woodard, Oklahoma State (AP-1)

Offensive guards
 Anthony Phillips, Oklahoma (AP-1)
 Chris Stanley, Oklahoma State (AP-1)

Defensive selections

Defensive ends
 Broderick Thomas, Nebraska (AP-1)
 Kanavis McGhee, Colorado (AP-1)

Defensive lineman
 Scott Evans, Oklahoma (AP-1)
 Willie Griffin, Nebraska (AP-1)

Nose guards
 Lawrence Pete, Nebraska (AP-1)

Linebackers
 Mike Shane, Iowa State (AP-1)
 LeRoy Etienne, Nebraska (AP-1)

Defensive backs
 Adrian Jones, Missouri (AP-1)
 Charles Fryar, Nebraska (AP-1)
 Tim Jackson, Nebraska (AP-1)
 Scott Garl, Oklahoma (AP-1)

Special teams

Place-kicker
 Cary Blanchard, Oklahoma State (AP-1)

Punter
 Keith English, Colorado (AP-1)

Key

AP = Associated Press

See also
 1988 College Football All-America Team

References

All-Big Seven Conference football team
All-Big Eight Conference football teams